Aaron Michael Wheeler (born September 24, 1998) is an American professional basketball player for the Windy City Bulls of the NBA G League. He played college basketball for the Purdue Boilermakers and the St. John's Red Storm.

Wheeler signed with the Swarm after being drafted third overall in the 2022 NBA G League draft.

High school career
Wheeler attended Brewster Academy in Wolfeboro, New Hampshire. He was considered a three-star recruit and was ranked 174th in his class by 247Sports. Wheeler committed to Purdue on October 17, 2016, turning down offers from Northwestern, Providence, and Temple.

College career
Wheeler redshirted his freshman season. As a redshirt freshman in 2018-19, Wheeler posted averages of 4.7 points and 3.0 rebounds on 36.5% shooting from three-point range. Wheeler made 31 triples, the tenth-highest total by a freshman in Purdue basketball history. As a redshirt sophomore in 2019-20, Wheeler started nine games and averaged 3.6 points and 4.2 rebounds per game. As a redshirt junior in 2020-21, Wheeler started five games and averaged 3.9 points and 4.4 rebounds per game. 

Following his redshirt junior season, Wheeler announced that he would be entering the transfer portal after four years at Purdue. On April 1, 2021, Wheeler committed to play his senior season at St. John's. Wheeler entered St. John's with two years of eligibility remaining due to the COVID-shortened 2020 season. In his senior season, Wheeler got off to a slow start, averaging just 4.5 points per game in his first 11 games. The rest of the season, however, Wheeler averaged 13.1 points per game on 39.6% 3-point shooting, finishing the season with career-high averages of 10.0 points, 4.7 rebounds, 1.5 assists, and 1.0 blocks in a career-high 22.0 minutes per game. Following his double-redshirt junior campaign, Wheeler declared for the 2022 NBA draft, forgoing his final year of collegiate eligibility.

Professional career

Greensboro Swarm (2022)
After going undrafted in the 2022 NBA draft, Wheeler signed a summer league contract with the Miami Heat. After the 2022 NBA Summer League, Wheeler failed to make an NBA roster. On October 22, 2022, Wheeler was drafted with the third overall pick in the 2022 NBA G League draft. On December 14, 2022, Wheeler was waived.

Windy City Bulls (2022–present)
On December 23, 2022, Wheeler signed a contract to join the Windy City Bulls.

Personal life
Wheeler is the son of Michelle and William Wheeler Jr. His father was a college basketball standout at Manhattan, scoring 1,278 points in just two years and subsequently being named to the Manhattan College Hall of Fame. His brother, Brandon Wheeler, played college basketball at Bentley University. His uncle, Ken Wheeler, played college basketball at Yale.

References

Greensboro Swarm players
Living people
1998 births
Brewster Academy alumni
Purdue Boilermakers men's basketball players